EtBr may refer to:

Bromoethane
Endothelin_B_receptor (when written as ETBR)
Ethidium bromide